Big Thinkers may refer to:

Big Thinkers (TV series)
Big Thinkers (video game series)